Pirita-Kose-Kloostrimetsa Circuit is an inactive street circuit in Tallinn, Estonia. It is located in Pirita in Kloostrimets (Monastery Forest), crosses the Pirita River twice.

The circuit was opened in 17 September 1933. Motorcycle TT races took place from 1933 to 1939 and car races were held from 1934 to 1936 as Estonian Grand Prix with mainly local and Finnish entries. After World War II the track was used for Soviet championships.

Five-time world champion Joey Dunlop was killed in an accident on the Kloostrimetsa circuit in 2000. A memorial stone was erected a year later. In 3 June 2006, the track was closed for racing after the 2006 annual Kalevi Suursõit motorcycle race as in order to bring the safety up to acceptable levels, hundreds of trees along the track would be needed to be felled, all of which are under protection as part of the park surrounding the track.

Gallery

Lap records 

The official race lap records at the Pirita-Kose-Kloostrimetsa Circuit are listed as:

References

Defunct motorsport venues
Motorsport venues in Estonia
Motorcycle Road Racing Venues
Sports venues in Tallinn
1930s establishments in Estonia